Everettia is a genus of air-breathing land snails, terrestrial pulmonate gastropod mollusks in the family Dyakiidae.

The species within this genus are very difficult to identify from shells only, because the shells are all very similar.

Species 
The genus Everettia included 15 species in 2007 but there was described additional 11 species of Everettia in northern Borneo in 2009:

 Everettia corrugata Laidlaw, 1937
 Everettia corrugata corrugata Laidlaw, 1937
 Everettia corrugata williamsi Liew, Schilthuizen & Vermeulen, 2009
 Everettia dominiki Liew, Schilthuizen & Vermeulen, 2009
 Everettia interior Liew, Schilthuizen & Vermeulen, 2009
 Everettia jasilini Liew, Schilthuizen & Vermeulen, 2009
 Everettia jucunda (L. Pfeiffer, 1891) - the type species
 Everettia jucundior Liew, Schilthuizen & Vermeulen, 2009
 Everettia klemmantanica Gude, 1918
 Everettia lapidini Liew, Schilthuizen & Vermeulen, 2009
 Everettia layanglayang Liew, Schilthuizen & Vermeulen, 2009
 Everettia monticola Liew, Schilthuizen & Vermeulen, 2009
 Everettia occidentalis Liew, Schilthuizen & Vermeulen, 2009
 Everettia paulbasintali Liew, Schilthuizen & Vermeulen, 2009
 Everettia planispira Liew, Schilthuizen & Vermeulen, 2009
 Everettia safriei Liew, Schilthuizen & Vermeulen, 2009
 Everettia subconsul (Smith, 1887)
 Everettia themis (Smith, 1895)

References

Dyakiidae